Kommandodrif Dam is an earth-fill/rockfill type dam located on the Tarka River, near Cradock, Eastern Cape, South Africa. The dam is included in the Commando Drift Nature Reserve and its main purpose is to serve for irrigation use. The hazard potential of the dam has been ranked high (3).

See also
List of reservoirs and dams in South Africa
List of rivers of South Africa

References 

 List of South African Dams from the Department of Water Affairs

Dams in South Africa
Dams completed in 1956